The following is a timeline of the history of the city of Dhaka, Bangladesh.

Prior to 19th century

 8th century CE – Dhaka part of Pala Empire.
 1095 – Senas in power.
 1457 – Binat Bibi Mosque constructed.
 1459 – Gate built.
 1580s – Portuguese merchants open the first European trading post in Dhaka.
 1610 – City renamed Jahangirnagar; becomes capital of Bengal; Mughal Islam Khan in power.
 1639 – Capital relocated from Dhaka to Rajmahal.
 1640 – Mughal Eidgah mosque built.
 1642 – Hussaini Dalan (mosque) built.
 1645 – Bara Katra (caravansary) built.
 1646 – Navaratna temple built (approximate date).
 1649 – Lalbagh Fort mosque built.
 1659 – Capital relocated to Dhaka from Rajmahal.
 1660 – Pagla bridge built on Dacca-Narayangaj road (approximate date).
 1682 – 25 October: William Hedges, the first Agent and Governor of East India Company in the Bay of Bengal, arrived Dhaka.
 1663 – Choto Katra (caravansary) built.
 1668 – English Factory built.
 1676 – Chowk Bazaar Shai Mosque built.
 1677 – Holy Rosary Church built by Portuguese.
 1678 – Lalbagh palace construction begins.
 1679 – Shahbaz Khan Mosque and Khan Mohammad Mridha Mosque built.
 1696
 Mosque of Haji Kahjeh Shahabag built in Ramne (approximate date).
 Jayakali temple and Siva temple built in Thatari Bazar (approximate date).
 1704 – Murshid Quli Khan residence relocates from Dhaka to Murshidabad.
 1717 – Khan Muhammad Ali Khan becomes deputy governor.
 1723 – Itisam Khan becomes deputy governor.
 1728 – Mirza Lutfullah becomes deputy governor.
 1756 – Jasarat Khan becomes deputy governor.
 1765
 British East India Company in power.
 Population: 450,000 (estimate).
 1781 – Armenian Church built.
 1793 – Laxmi Narayan Mandir (temple) built.
 1800 – Population: 200,000 (estimate).

19th century
 1815
 Catholic church built.
 Lunatic Asylum founded.
 1819 – St. Thomas Church built.
 1825 – Population: 150,000 (approximate).
 1830
 Iron suspension bridge constructed across Dullye Creek.
 Gurdwara Nanak Shahi built.
 Population: 66,989.
 1834 – Ghaziuddin Haider becomes deputy governor.
 1835 – Dhaka Collegiate School established.
 1840 – Population bottoms out at 50,000.
 1846 – Union School is established to give the poor an English education.
 1850 – Catholic Apostolic Vicariate of Eastern Bengal established.
 1857 – Uprising of sepoys.
 1858
 City becomes part of British Raj.
 Mitford Hospital established.
 1864 – 1 August: Dacca Municipality established.
 1866 – Langar Khana (almshouse) founded.
 1872 – Population: 69,212.
 1874 – Madrasa established.
 1875 – Medical school established.
 1876 – Dhaka Survey School is established to teach surveying and road building in the vernacular.
 1878
 Water-works in operation.
 Eden Girls' College established.
 1880 – Northbrook Hall built.
 1881 – Population: 79,076.
 1882 – St Gregory's School founded.
 1883 – Jagannth College founded. (Now Jagannath University)
 1885 – Revenue service begins on the Narayanganj-Dhaka portion of the Dacca State Railway.
 1886 – Mymensingh-Dhaka railway opens.
 1888
 April: Tornado.
 Ahsan Manzil (Pink Palace) rebuilt.
 1892 – 16 March: Jeanette Rummary (as Jeanette Van Tassell) makes the first balloon ascension and parachute jump in Dhaka's history as a member of a travelling aerial exhibition led by Park Van Tassel.  
 1897 – 12 June: Earthquake.

20th century

1900s–1960s
 1901 – Population: 90,542; district of Dacca: 2,649,522.
 1902 – April: Tornado.
 1904 – Curzon Hall built.
 1905 – City becomes capital of newly formed East Bengal and Assam province.
 1906 – December: All India Muhammadan Educational Conference held.
 1909 – Baldha Garden laid out.
 1911 – Dhaka Club organized.
 1918 – Influenza outbreak.
 1921 – University of Dhaka established.
 1946 – Dhaka Medical College established.
 1947 – City becomes capital of East Bengal, a province of newly independent Pakistan.
 1949 – All Pakistan Women's Association East Pakistan Branch organized.
 1951
 Habib Productions theatre troupe active.
 Area of city: 85 square kilometers.
 Population: 411,279.
 1952 – Asiatic Society organized.
 1953 – Holy Family Hospital built.
 1954
 Dhaka Stock Exchange incorporated.
 Dacca Stadium and New Market built.
 1955
 City becomes capital of East Pakistan.
 Bangla Academy established.
 1956
 Drama Circle active.
 RAJUK Bhaban built.
 1959 – Alliance Française de Dhaka founded.
 1960 – Islamia Eye Hospital and Cholera Research Hospital founded.
 1961 – Tejgaon College established.
 1964 – Bangabhaban reconstructed.
 1965 – Institute of Postgraduate Medicine and Research and Jinnah College founded.
 1967 – Officers' Club established.
 1968
 Protests against Ayub Khan regime.
 Baitul Mukarram (mosque) built.

1970s–1990s
 1970
 November: Bhola cyclone.
 Jiraz Art Gallery in business.
 1971
 7 March: Sheikh Mujibur Rahman speaks at Ramna Race Course Maidan.
 25 March: Bangladesh Liberation War begins; Dhaka University massacre.
 27 March: Ramna Kali Mandir (temple) razed.
 16 December: Instrument of Surrender signed.
 City becomes capital of the People's Republic of Bangladesh.
 The Bangladesh Observer newspaper in publication.
 1972
 Ekushey Book Fair begins.
 Dhaka Shishu Hospital established.
 Abahani Limited sports club formed.
 Shaheed Minar (monument) rebuilt.
 1973 – Dhaka Theatre established.
 1974
 Abul Hasnat becomes mayor.
 Dhaka Zoo established.
 Saju Art Gallery in business.
 Population: 1,730,253 urban agglomeration.
 1975
 Islamic Foundation Bangladesh formed.
 15 August: Sheikh Mujibur Rahman is assassinated.
 3 November: Awami League leaders killed in Dhaka Central Jail.
 1976 – Dhaka Metropolitan Police department established.
 1977 – 2 October: Coup attempt.
 1980 – School of the Society for Education in Theatre established.
 1981
 Bangladesh Group Theatre Federation organized.
 Area of city: 510 square kilometers.
 Population: 3,440,147.
 1982
 Mahamudul Hassan becomes mayor.
 Jatiyo Sangshad Bhaban (parliament building) constructed.
 Mirpur and Gulshan become part of Dhaka municipality.
 1983 – Bangladesh Shilpa Bank Bhaban built.
 1985
 December: South Asian Association for Regional Cooperation summit held.
 Bangladesh Bank Building and Janata Bank Bhaban constructed.
 The National Library of Bangladesh moves into a new, purpose-built facility.
 1986 – Bangladesh Medical College established.
 1989
 Maziur Rhaman becomes mayor.
 Dhaka Pantomime group formed.
 1990 – Abul Hasnat becomes mayor.
 1991
 Mirza Abbas becomes mayor.
 Daily Star newspaper begins publication.
 Area of city: 1,353 square kilometers.
 Population: 6,887,459.
 1993
 Independent University, Bangladesh was established.
 1994
 Mohammad Hanif becomes mayor.
 Puppet Development Centre opens.
 1995
 Pantapath road and Dhaka Nagar Bhaban constructed.
 Dhaka Imperial College established.
 1996 – East West University established.
 1998 – Prothom Alo newspaper begins publication.
 1999 – March: D-8 summit held.
 2000
 Chobi Mela International Photography Festival begins.
 Bengal Gallery of Fine Arts opens.

21st century

 2001
 BRAC University established.
 Area of city: 1,530 square kilometers.
 2002
 Sadeque Hossain Khoka becomes mayor.
 China Bangladesh Friendship Center built.
 2004 – Bangabandhu Sheikh Mujibur Rahman Novo Theatre and Bashundhara City (shopping mall) open.
 2005
 Jagannath College transformed into Jagannath University
Concord Grand built.
 2008 – Population: 7,000,940.
 2011
 Hay Festival begins.
 Population: 8,906,035.
 2012
 April: Demonstration.
 Dhaka Gladiators cricket team formed.
 City Centre (building) constructed.
 City designated a Capital of Islamic Culture.
 2013
 Protests in Shahbag.
 2013 Savar building collapse.
 2014 – Air pollution in Dhaka reaches annual mean of 90 PM2.5 and 158 PM10, much higher than recommended.
 2016 – 1 July: Gulshan attack.
 2019 – 20 February: Chowk Bazaar fire.

See also
 History of Dhaka
 Dhaka District
 Timeline of Bangladeshi history
 List of cities proper by population density

Notes

References

Bibliography

Published in 19th century

Published in 20th century

Published in 21st century

External links

 

 
Dhaka
Dhaka-related lists
dhaka
dhaka
Dhaka